Brześce-Kolonia  is a village in the administrative district of Gmina Janowiec, within Puławy County, Lublin Voivodeship, in eastern Poland.

References

Villages in Puławy County